Vicente Troudart was a Panamanian baseball umpire who worked numerous international events, including the 2004 Olympics. He died January 9, 2016 at 64 years old.

References

2016 deaths
Baseball umpires
2004 Summer Olympics
Year of birth missing